The Kesecek Köyü inscription is a 4th century BCE Aramaic inscription originally located on the cliffs overlooking the Berdan River near the village of Kesecek Köyü about 25-35 km north-east of Tarsus, Mersin.

It is similar in nature to the Sarıaydın inscription.

The inscription measures 46 cm wide by 30 cm high. It is known at KAI 258.

It is currently at the Peabody Museum of Natural History at Yale.

Bibliography
 Charles Cutler Torrey, "An Aramaic Inscription from Cilicia, in the Museum of Yale University" JAOS 35 (1915): 370–74
 Hanson, R.S., "Aramaic Funerary and Boundary Inscriptions from Asia Minor." BASOR 192 (1968): 3–11. Kesecek Daskyleion LimBil GozBdSt

References

Aramaic inscriptions